Le Relais is a ski mountain just 15 minutes from downtown Quebec City, Canada.  It is the smallest of the four ski stations located near Quebec City with Mont Sainte-Anne, Stoneham and Le Massif.

Description 

Located in Lac-Beauport, Le Relais is a family station of excellence known for the surface quality of its tracks. Although not a destination resort, Le Relais provides a very good ski experience thanks to the skiable field which can be entirely snow-covered artificially.  Moreover, all of the tracks are well illuminated attracting a lot of people for night skiing.

Le Relais is also the home of the Centre national acrobatique Yves Laroche (CNAYL), an aerial skiing center.  The CNAYL has a water ramp making summer training possible.

In summer Le Relais becomes an adventure center providing five high rope courses better known in the region as arbre en arbre.

History 

Le Relais was founded in 1936, but the idea of it came during the 1933-1934 winter.  At that time, it was suggested to locate the ski center on the Plains of Abraham but Herman "Jackrabbit" Smith-Johannsen, proposed another location : the Murphy mountain.  The mountain of the actual site of Le Relais was then bought for the price of $1000.  $8500 was raised to build a small lodge at the bottom of the mountain.

Le Relais is known as the birthplace of skiing in Quebec City.

See also
 Mont-Sainte-Anne
 Stoneham
 List of ski areas and resorts in Canada

External links
Le Relais English Website
First Tracks!! Online Ski Magazine

Ski areas and resorts in Quebec
Geography of Capitale-Nationale
Tourist attractions in Capitale-Nationale